André Gonçalves Barbosa (born November 16, 1975) is a Brazilian actor. He started his career when he was discovered in a poor community by director Roberto Bomtempo in the 1980s.

Biography 
Born in Natal, Rio Grande do Norte, on November 16, 1975, André had a challenging life in his early years. He was raised in Parque Arará and Vila do João slums in Rio de Janeiro. Until the age of four, he lived with his mother, father, and brother. At the age of 12, he sold popcorn in regions close to the Rio de Janeiro Bus Terminal. His mother, however, began to suffer from mental disorders after the birth of her third child. He then was discovered by director Roberto Bomtempo, he starred in 1989 on the television channel on Rede Bandeirantes. 

In 1992, he mobilized friends and the community in which he lived to look for his mother, Maria da Penha. She was later found in the city center and stayed for a few days at the actor's house in Vargem Grande. With the worsening of his mother's mental problems, André moved to São João de Meriti, in Baixada Fluminense.

Career 
In 1989, he made his television debut as Breno Gomes Batista in the mini-series Capitães de Areia, based on the book, Captains of the Sands by Jorge Amado. After his debut in the mini-series, André landed numerous roles in Brazilian cinema and television. Consequently, he worked in soap operas such as The Next Victim (1995), Senhora do Destino (2004), Alma Gêmea (2005), Paraíso Tropical (2007), Caminho das Índias (2009), Morde e Assopra (2011), Amor Eterno Amor (2012), Salve Jorge (2012) and Geração Brasil (2014). 

In 2015, he was invited to play Etevaldo, a drummer who was looking for a relationship with Leonardo, a character by Klebber Toledo. He was awarded Best Supporting Actor in 2011 Best of the Year award on TV Globo.

On April 12, 2018, André Gonçalves was confirmed to play the role of Barrabás by RecordTV, for the series, Jesus.

Personal life 
In 1991, André began dating actress Carol Machado, with whom he starred in the soap opera, Vamp, staying together until 1994. Between 1994 and 1996 he dated actress Natália Lage. In 1997, André began dating Renata Sorrah, who was 28 years older than him. However, it lasted only a few months. 

In 1997, he had a brief romance with actress Tereza Seiblitz – with whom he had his first daughter, Manuela Seiblitz, born on February 13, 1999. In 1999 he began a relationship with Myrian Rios, with whom he starred in Era uma Vez.... After three months of dating, he went to live in Myrian's house, where she lived with her son. 

In 2000, the couple broke up for a few months and André had a brief romance with Alessandra Negrini, and that same year the actor resumed his relationship with Myrian. Their second child, Pedro Arthur Rios Gonçalves, was born in Rio de Janeiro, on December 7, 2001, and, in 2002, the marital union with Myrian came to an end amicably.

In 2002, he started dating journalist Cynthia Benini, whom he met on the reality show Casa dos Artistas. They married on September 27 of that year. On March 31, 2003, the actor's third daughter, Valentina Benini, was born. In 2006 the marriage came to an end after four years. 

Between 2009 and 2011 he dated the actress Letícia Sabatella, who he met on the soap opera Caminho das Índias. Between 2013 and 2015 he dated singer Bianca Chami, with whom he even planned a wedding, although it didn't amount to marriage. 

In 2016, he started dating actress Danielle Winits, marrying her on November 24th.

In November 2021, he was arrested by the police for failing, since 2007, to support his daughter, 18-year-old Valentina. In July 2022 another arrest warrant was issued by the State of Santa Catarina concerning a debt of 350 thousand reais (worth about US$66.000 at the time) in alimony due to his daughter Valentina. The actor paid his debt and was released after sixty days of house arrest.

Controversies 
On January 3, 2017, journalist Leo Dias reported in his column in the newspaper O Dia that Danielle Winits lied when she said she was pregnant and that she received priority care to board a flight to New York.

André, who is Danielle's husband, shared a video on social media about the subject. In the video he said:

On January 11, Danielle went to the 14th Police Station in Leblon, Rio de Janeiro, to file a complaint against the journalist. Leo Dias also filed a complaint against André Gonçalves for insult and threat. The first hearing in the lawsuit filed against Gonçalves took place on March 27 of the same year, at a forum in Barra da Tijuca, Rio de Janeiro, but journalist Leo Dias did not attend the hearing. Later, Leo announced on his show, Gossiping, that the case had been resolved.

Filmography

Television

Awards/Nominations

References 

1975 births
Male actors from Rio de Janeiro (city)
Brazilian male film actors
20th-century Brazilian male actors
21st-century Brazilian male actors
Living people
Brazilian male television actors